It's Lonely at the Bottom/Unstuck in Time is a compilation album by the punk rock band Jughead's Revenge. It is a CD re-release of the band's first two albums, Unstuck in Time and It's Lonely at the Bottom, containing all of the tracks from both releases.

Track listing
Tracks 1-16 are from It's Lonely at the Bottom; tracks 17-28 are from Unstuck in Time.

Personnel
 Joe Doherty - vocals
 Joey Rimicci − guitar
 George Snow − guitar
 Brian Preiss − bass
 Nenus Givargus − drums

References

1995 compilation albums
Jughead's Revenge albums